Charles Kaboré (born 9 February 1988) is a Burkinabé professional footballer who plays as a defensive midfielder for French  club Niort and the Burkina Faso national team. A Burkina Faso international since 2006, he has become the country's most capped player.

Club career

Kaboré played for the youth side of Association Sportive SONABEL and Etoile Filante Ouagadougou. In 2006, after two years with Etoile Filante Ouagadougou he was scouted from Libourne-Saint-Seurin.

In January 2008, he was signed by Olympique de Marseille from Libourne-Saint-Seurin.

In January 2013, he signed for Kuban Krasnodar of the Russian Premier League.

On 25 August 2015, he signed for the other Russian team, FC Krasnodar on loan with a buyout option. On 20 June 2016, FC Krasnodar bought his rights from Kuban and he signed a contract with them until 2019.

On 20 May 2019, FC Krasnodar confirmed that Kaboré will leave the club after his contract expires at the end of the 2018–19 season.

On 17 July 2019, he signed a two-year contract with Russian club FC Dynamo Moscow.

On 3 June 2022, Kaboré joined Ligue 2 side Niort.

International career
Kaboré played his first international match for Burkina Faso in 2006. On 24 March 2021, he played his 100th match for Burkina Faso in a goalless draw against Uganda during the 2021 Africa Cup of Nations qualification.

Career statistics

Club

International
Scores and results list Burkina Faso's goal tally first, score column indicates score after each Kaboré goal.

Honours
Marseille
Ligue 1: 2009–10
Coupe de la Ligue: 2009–10, 2010–11, 2011–12
Trophée des Champions: 2010, 2011

Kuban Krasnodar
Russian Cup: Runner-up: 2015

Burkina Faso
Africa Cup of Nations: Runner-up: 2013

See also
 List of men's footballers with 100 or more international caps

References

External links
 The Official Website of Charles Kaboré
 
 
 

1988 births
Living people
People from Bobo-Dioulasso
Association football midfielders
Burkinabé footballers
Burkina Faso international footballers
2010 Africa Cup of Nations players
2012 Africa Cup of Nations players
2013 Africa Cup of Nations players
AS SONABEL players
Étoile Filante de Ouagadougou players
FC Libourne players
Olympique de Marseille players
FC Kuban Krasnodar players
FC Krasnodar players
FC Dynamo Moscow players
Chamois Niortais F.C. players
Ligue 1 players
Ligue 2 players
Russian Premier League players
Burkinabé expatriate footballers
Expatriate footballers in France
Burkinabé expatriate sportspeople in France
Expatriate footballers in Russia
2015 Africa Cup of Nations players
2017 Africa Cup of Nations players
FIFA Century Club
21st-century Burkinabé people